Krasivaya Mecha is a river in Tula and Lipetsk oblasts in Russia. The river freezes over in late November and is icebound until early April.

The town of Yefremov is along the Krasivaya Mecha River.

In his Sketches from a Hunter's Album, Russian writer Ivan Turgenev describes the area surrounding the river as the "Beautiful Lands," in reference to it being regarded as "one of the most beautiful regions in European Russia," according to the endnotes provided by Richard Freeborn for the English translation.

References

Rivers of Lipetsk Oblast
Rivers of Tula Oblast